Runa Laila (born 17 November 1952) is a Bangladeshi  playback singer and composer. She started her career in Pakistan film industry in the late 1960s. Her style of singing is inspired by Pakistani playback singer Ahmed Rushdi and she also made a pair with him after replacing another singer Mala. Her playback singing in films – The Rain (1976), Jadur Banshi (1977), Accident (1989), Ontore Ontore (1994), Devdas (2013) and Priya Tumi Shukhi Hou (2014) - earned her seven Bangladesh National Film Awards for Best Female Playback Singer. She won the Best Music Composer award for the film Ekti Cinemar Golpo (2018).

Early life
Laila was born in Sylhet to Syed Mohammed Imdad Ali, a civil servant posted in Karachi, and Amina Laila, a musical artist. Her maternal uncle, Subir Sen, was a notable Indian playback singer. She started taking dance lessons of Kathak and Bharatanatyam genre. In those days, Ahmed Rushdi was the leading film singer who introduced rock n roll, disco and other modern genres to South Asian music. Following Rushdi's success, Christian bands specialising in jazz started performing at various night clubs and hotel lobbies in Karachi, Hyderabad, Mumbai, Dhaka and Lahore. Laila became a fan of singer Ahmed Rushdi whom she considered her guru (teacher), and tried to emulate not only his singing style but also the way he used to perform on the stage. She then learned classical music with her elder sister Dina Laila (d. 1976).
While she was a student of Saint Lawrence Convent, she won an inter-school singing competition in Karachi in the then West Pakistan. She, along with her sister, were trained by Ustad Abdul Kader Peyarang and Ustad Habibuddin Ahmed. Her cousin, Anjumara Begum, had already been a known singer. When Laila was 12, she performed as a playback singer for a male child actor in the Urdu language film Jugnu. The song was titled Gudia Si Munni Meri.

Career

In 1966, Laila made her breakthrough in the Pakistani film industry with the song Unki Nazron Sey Mohabbat Ka Jo Paigham Mila for the Urdu film Hum Dono. She used to perform on PTV. In PTV, she had a show called Bazm E Laila. She started appearing on the Zia Mohyuddin Show (1972–74) and later sang songs for films in the 1970s such as the film Umrao Jaan Ada (1972).

Laila moved to Bangladesh along with her family in 1974. Her first Bengali song was O Amar Jibon Shathi for the film Jibon Shathi (1976), composed by Satya Saha. Shortly after had her first concert in India in 1974 in Mumbai. She started in Bollywood with director Jaidev, whom she met in Delhi, got her the chance to play at the inauguration of Doordarshan. She first worked with the music composer Kalyanji-Anandji for the title song of a film called Ek Se Badhkar Ek (1976). She gained popularity in India with the songs O Mera Babu Chail Chabila and Dama Dam Mast Qalandar. In 1974, she recorded Shaadher Lau in Kolkata.  Laila's name has been written on the Guinness World Records for recording 30 songs within 3 days. In 1982, she won Golden Disk Award as her album Superuna composed by Bappi Lahiri was sold over 1 lakh copies on the first day of its release.

In October 2009, Laila released Kala Sha Kala, a collection of Punjabi wedding songs, in India. In 2012, Laila served as a judge on the show Sur Kshetra, an Indian television contest show for amateur singers. She described her relationship with fellow judge Asha Bhosle as that of sisters. In 2014, she collaborated with Sabina Yasmin on a song for a television play "Dalchhut Projapoti", the first time they worked on a song together. Laila has sung in seventeen languages including her native Bengali, Hindi, Urdu, Punjabi, Sindhi, Gujarati, Pashto, Baluchi, Arabic, Persian, Malay, Nepalese, Japanese, Italian, Spanish, French and English.

Personal life
Laila has been married three times. She first married Khawaza Javed Kaiser, secondly a Swiss citizen named Ron Daniel and then actor Alamgir. She has a daughter Tani. Her grandson Zain Islam had been selected for the Arsenal progression center in 2012 when he was eight. Her other grandson Aaron Islam is also there.

Charity
After her sister died in 1976 from cancer, Laila held several charity concerts in Dhaka. The money raised was used to build a cancer hospital in Dhaka. Laila was named a SAARC Goodwill Ambassador for HIV/AIDS. She is the first Bangladeshi to hold this post. She visited New Delhi in 2013 on her first trip as the SAARC ambassador. She met India's External and Health ministers.

Discography

 Sincerely Yours (1973)
 Runa Laila Sings Songs Of Talib-Ul-Maulla (1974)
 Great Ghazals - Runa Laila (Style) (1981)
 Runa in Pakistan (Geet) and (Ghazals) (1980)
 Bappi Lahiri Presents Runa Laila - Superuna (1982)
 Runa Goes Disco (1982)
 Sings For Umrao Jaan Ada (Ghazals) (1985)
 Ganga Amar Ma Padma Amar Ma (1996)
 Bazm-E-Laila (2007)
 Runa Laila-Kala Siah Kala (2010)

Awards
 Radio Mirchi Music Award presented by Radio Mirchi at Nazrul Mancha in Kolkata (2015)
 Independence Day Award, Bangladesh
 Bangladesh National Film Award for Best Female Playback Singer (1976, 1977, 1989, 1994, 2012, 2013 and 2014)
 Sheltech Award, Bangladesh
 Lux-Channel I Lifetime Performance Award, Bangladesh
 Saigal Award, India
 Nigar Award, Pakistan (1968, 1970)
 Critics Award, Pakistan
 Graduate Award, Pakistan
 Firoza Begum Memorial Gold Medal, Bangladesh
 Bangladesh Music Journalists Association (BMJA) lifetime achievement award, 2020

References

External links
 

Living people
1952 births
People from Sylhet
20th-century Bangladeshi women singers
20th-century Bangladeshi singers
Women ghazal singers
Bengali playback singers
Bollywood playback singers
Sindhi-language singers
Punjabi-language singers
Bangladeshi ghazal singers
Nigar Award winners
Pakistani emigrants to Bangladesh
Best Female Playback Singer National Film Award (Bangladesh) winners
Recipients of the Independence Day Award
Honorary Fellows of Bangla Academy
Best Female Singer Bachsas Award winners
Best Music Composer National Film Award (Bangladesh) winners
21st-century Bangladeshi women singers
21st-century Bangladeshi singers